MD S.p.A. is an Italian global discount supermarket chain, based in Gricignano di Aversa, Italy.

History
The company was founded in the 1994s by Patrizio Podini. The first store in MD brand was opened in September 1994 in Mugnano di Napoli. In little more than a year have been opened more than fifty stores in the Centre-South, some of whom detecting signs premises.

In 2015 MD distributes its products through a network of 800 outlets and direct affiliates.

Recently MD bought LD Market for the price of 170 million, making it the third largest sector discount in Italy, after Eurospin and Lidl.

Testimonial
 Antonella Clerici

See also 
 List of companies of Italy

References

External links 
 Official web site

Retail companies established in 1994
Italian companies established in 1994
Retail companies of Italy